John A "Johnny" Lechner is an American film and television actor best known for his role as Alan Reese on the television series Girls of Sunset Place (Showtime, 2012) and his role as Greg "Fossil" Karanowski in the movie Fraternity House (2008). He is also known for being a perpetual student at the University of Wisconsin–Whitewater, having studied there from 1995 until 2010.

Academic career
Lechner was born in Fort Hood, Texas, but grew up in Pewaukee, Wisconsin. Lechner graduated from Waukesha North High School in 1994.

Lechner did not graduate from the University of Wisconsin-Whitewater in 2006, 2007, 2008, or 2009, despite having enough credits to graduate with nine majors and five minors. Lechner announced that he had transferred to a different college in California in 2010.

At Whitewater, Lechner won a campus "Big Man on Campus" beauty pageant, studied abroad in, "Paris, London, Amsterdam, Rome, Florence, Venice and Switzerland," and South Africa, appeared on Late Show with David Letterman and Good Morning America, was named one of People'''s "Hot Bachelors", ran for student body president, and appeared in two films, including Minor League: A Football Story and a starring role in Fraternity House''.

The "Johnny Lechner rule"
The Wisconsin Board of Regents instituted a "Johnny Lechner rule" requiring long-term students to pay twice the standard in-state tuition rate.

References

External links
www.JohnnyLechner.com

Living people
People from Waukesha, Wisconsin
Students in the United States
University of Wisconsin–Whitewater alumni
Year of birth missing (living people)
Male actors from Wisconsin